John Ray Bradford III (born September 9, 1974) is a member of the North Carolina General Assembly representing the state's 98th House district, including constituents in Mecklenburg County.  Bradford, a Republican succeeded Thom Tillis after his successful run for the United States Senate.

Bradford lost his 2018 re-election campaign to Democrat Christy Clark of Huntersville, North Carolina. He would later regain his seat by beating Clark in a rematch in 2020.

Life and career
Bradford earned his bachelor's degree in engineering from Clemson University in 1996 and his MBA from the University of Memphis in 2000. He is the founder of Park Avenue Properties, a property management business.

Electoral history

2020

2018

2016

2014

References

External links
Official House Website

|-

Living people
1974 births
People from South Carolina
University of Memphis alumni
Clemson University alumni
21st-century American politicians
Republican Party members of the North Carolina House of Representatives